Erik Hedin (born 15 September 1974) is a sound designer and composer, and has worked closely with his partner Kjersti Horn.

Career
Hedin is a graduate from the Dramatiska Institutet in Stockholm 2006, as sound designer and composer. He has contributed as sound designer and composer to a series of productions like Mitt namn er Rachel Corrie at Det Norske Teatret / Riksteatret (2008), Alfa og Omega – Edvard Munch at Oslo Nye Teater (2009), Hustyrannen at Nationaltheatret (2010), Anna Karenina at Stockholm Stadsteater (2010), Jeg var Fritz Moen (Riksteatret / Teater Manu (2010), Peer Gynt Rogaland Teater (2010) / Stavanger Symphony Orchestra / Festspillene i Bergen (2011). During the Swedish Theatre Biennial in 2009, he held the lecture "Lyddesign som scenografi."

Honors
Hedin was nominated for Hedda Award 2012, in the category This year's play for Jeg var Fritz Moen as sound designer.

References

External links
Hedin Sound Design

Sound designers
Dramatiska Institutet alumni
Norwegian male composers
1974 births
Living people